Portel is a Brazilian municipality located in the state of Pará. Its population as of 2020 is estimated to be 62,945 people. The area of the municipality is 25,384.779 km². The city belongs to the mesoregion Marajó and to the microregion of Portel.

References

Municipalities in Pará